Lars Broholm Tharp (born 27 March 1954, Copenhagen, Denmark) is a Danish-born British historian, lecturer and broadcaster, and one of the longest running 'experts' on the BBC antiques programme, Antiques Roadshow, first appearing in 1986.

Early life and education
Tharp was born in Copenhagen on 27 March 1954, the son of Harry Tharp and Anne Marie Broholm. His maternal grandfather was the keeper of Antiquities at the National Museum of Denmark, Copenhagen and an expert on the Bronze Age. After moving to England aged six, Lars was educated at Wyggeston Grammar School for Boys in Leicester, England, before studying for an undergraduate degree in Archaeology and Anthropology at Gonville and Caius College, Cambridge.

Career
In 1977, a year after graduating, Tharp began working as an auctioneer at Sotheby's, where he specialised in European and Chinese ceramics. Tharp continued to work with Sotheby's for sixteen years, becoming a director in 1983. He left to form his own company Lars Tharp Ltd in 1993.  In 2008 he was appointed the Director of the Foundling Museum in London, and Visiting Professor at De Montfort University, Leicester. Since 2010 Tharp has represented the Foundling Museum as its ‘Hogarth Curator’. As a ceramic historian Tharp also contributed to the major Tate Gallery exhibition ‘Hogarth and Europe’ and during its run(Nov 2021-March 2022), delivering a keynote speech at Colonial Williamsburg VA

Tharp is also well known for his regular appearances (1986 to present) as a ceramics expert on the BBC’s globally seen antiques programme Antiques Roadshow.

Representing Gonville & Caius College, Cambridge, he joined team-members Helen Castor, Mark Damazer (captain) and Quentin Stafford-Fraser to win the Alumni University Challenge 2013.

Tharp is a noted William Hogarth enthusiast. Noting The artist's theatrical use of ceramics in his paintings and prints he wrote Hogarth's China to accompany an exhibition timed to commemorate the artist's tercentenary (1997). The exhibition was expanded and ran at Wedgwood in the following year.

Tharp devised three further exhibitions for York Museum Trust under the umbrella 'Celebrating Ceramics' (2003).  He was a member of YMT's steering group setting up their Centre of Ceramic Art (CoCA).

Tharp has received two Honorary Doctorates: from De Montfort University (HonDArt); and from Leicester University (HonDLitt) and was elected Fellow of the Society of Antiquaries of London in 2010. He serves on the court of England's oldest recorded guild, the Worshipful Company of Weavers (est. by 1130AD).

An accredited speaker for (inter alia) The Arts Society (NADFAS), Tharp lectures throughout Europe, Asia and Australasia and leads cultural tours to China, Dresden, Scandinavia and within the UK.

In February 2021 Tharp was made A Deputy Lieutenant of Leicestershire.

Personal life
Tharp lives in Leicestershire with his wife Gillian Block, whom he married in 1983. They have two daughters, Helena and Georgina, who share a birthday.

Apart from antiques, Tharp has a particular interest in music, having played the cello since the age of eight. He also lists travel among his interests, leading cultural tours in Britain, China and Scandinavia.

Media appearances

Television
All BBC unless stated:
 Quizeum (2015) – panellist
 University Challenge (Alumni) – panellist Gonville & Caius College, Cambridge (series winner, 2013/4)
 One Man and his Pug -in search of Hogarth's 'Trump' (2013
 China in Six Easy Pieces (2013) – presenter, writer
 Treasures of Chinese Porcelain (2011) – presenter, co-writer
 Fragile History of Ceramics: Handmade in Britain (2011) – expert
 The Antiques Roadshow (1986–present) – expert
 The Real Collector's Guide (1995) – presenter (Channel One, London)
 Antiques Inspectors (1997, 1999) – expert
 Inside Antiques (2004) – presenter
 Castle in the Country (2004–2008) – expert

Radio
 Hidden Treasures (1998–2002) – chairman/ co-writer 
 Out of the Fire (2000) – presenter
 For What It's Worth (2002–2006) – presenter
 Archive Hour (Radio 4): Men in Bow Ties (2007) – presenter
 On the China Trail (2007) – presenter
 Earth to Earth: Potted Immortality (2009) – presenter
 Twenty Minutes: There's Something About the Cello (2011) – presenter
 A journey around Hans Christian Andersen (2005 – co-presenter with Michael Rosen)

Publications
 The Little, Brown Illustrated Encyclopaedia of Antiques (ed. with Paul Atterbury), 1994
 Hogarth's China: Hogarth's Paintings and Eighteenth-century Ceramics, 1997
 Reader's Digest: Treasures in Your Home (with David Battie)
 How to Spot a Fake, 1999
 A-Z of 20th Century Antiques (ed.), 2000
 ‘’Hogarth and Europe’’(Tate 2021-2022 exhibition catalogue, contributor) 2021

References

External links
Official website
De Montfort University

1954 births
Living people
Danish emigrants to England
People from Copenhagen
People educated at Wyggeston Grammar School for Boys
Alumni of Gonville and Caius College, Cambridge
Danish curators
English curators
Antiques experts
Fellows of the Society of Antiquaries of London
People from Leicestershire